Scherezade García (sometimes Scherezade García-Vázquez) (born 1966) is a Dominican-born, American painter, printmaker, and installation artist. She is a co-founder of the Dominican York Proyecto GRÁFICA Collective.  García is an Advisor to the Board of Directors of No Longer Empty and sits on the board of directors of the College Art Association (CAA) for the period of 2020–2024.  She is assistant professor of Art at the University of Texas at Austin. She currently lives and works in Brooklyn, New York and Austin, Texas and is represented by Praxis Art in New York, and Ibis Contemporary Art Gallery in New Orleans.

Early life and education 
Born in Santo Domingo, Dominican Republic, García has been active in the visual arts from the time she was a child. After graduating with an AAS from the Altos de Chavón School of Design, a Parsons affiliate, in La Romana, Dominican Republic in 1986, she won a full merit scholarship to attend Parsons School of Design in New York City. She received a BFA cum laude from Parsons in 1988 and completed an MFA in Sculpture at City College of New York in 2011. Since 1986, she has lived and worked in New York. She is the sister of artist iliana emilia García.

Career 
She served on the faculty of Parsons School of Design from 2010 to 2021. She joined the University of Texas at Austin as Assistant Professor of Art in 2021. In 2015, she received a career grant from the Joan Mitchell Foundation. Much of García's work deals with themes relating to themes of  history, colonially and Afro-Atlantic legacies; her art is informed by aspects of her black and European heritage. Four of her mixed-media works are in the collection of the Smithsonian American Art Museum. Other works may be found in the collections of El Museo del Barrio, the Housatonic Museum of Art, and the Museo de Arte Moderno Santo Domingo.

Selected grants, awards, and residencies 

 2020: Colene Brown Art Prize, BRIC, Brooklyn, NY
2017: Artist-in-residence, The Joan Mitchell Foundation Center, New Orleans, LA
 2015: Painters and Sculptors Grant, The Joan Mitchell Foundation, New York, NY
 2012: Artist-in-residence, The Serie Project, Serie XIX, Austin, TX
 2005: NYC Department of Cultural Affairs Lehman College Art Gallery Grant, Bronx, NY
 2004: Aljira Emerge 6, A Career Management and Exhibition Program for Emerging Artists
 1999: Official Dominican Republic Artist Representative, Bienal de la Habana
 1996: Official Dominican Republic Artist Representative, International Biennal of Paintings, Haute de Cagnes, France

Selected works 

 Paradise Redefined: at the Lehman College Art Gallery, December 2006, a sculptural installation of tent like structures covered with images of Dominican tenant buildings and bodegas, with light, street sounds and fragments of Spanish language emanating from within. Intermittently breaking wave sounds add to the mix coming from a mural size beach scene. "The installation is concerned with issues of identity and homeland, and the expectations of a better life, which often characterize stories of migration to the United States." said Benjamin Gennochio, critic for The New York Times.
 Hurricane Sandy Altar: 2013, is a painting featured in an essay by Abigail Lapin Dardashti titled El Dorado: the Neobaroque in Dominican American Art, focusing the use of gold by Dominican artists who subvert myths and dreams constructed by imperialist and neocolonialist economic and political systems 
 Transit/Liquid Highway: September 2015, exhibited in the lobby of Columbia University's Wallach Art Gallery Miller Theatre, is a site-specific mural explores the relationship between the Dominican Republic and immigrants new homeland. Large images of waves and found objects both intermix losses and gains of migration
Acariciando el chivo/Caressing the Goat:  The painting  García's painting hearkens to the 19th century after the island's separation and re-colonization by Spain. Depicted as an androgynous, Black child holding a goat, Ulises Heureaux - known as Lili and born illegitimately to a Haitian father and a mother from St. Thomas - is shown in Garcia's beautifully abstracted painting as a ghostly image existing between two swirling universes. As the man who led the country of Santo Domingo during the years 1882 until Lili's assassination in 1899 he was considered heroic, and very much a contradiction of the 20th century myth of racial whiteness that the dictator Trujillo later projected.  The painting was featured in the exhibition Bordering the Imaginary: Art from the Dominican Republic, Haiti, and their Diasporas, curated by Abigail Lapin Dardashti in 2018 at BRIC Gallery, which explored the dynamic of the Haitian/Dominican diaspora.
 Memories of a Utopian Island: A site-specific installation and video animation Conversation Thread in collaboration with Vladimir Cybil Charlier. Two projected silhouettes of the artists tackle contemporary issues related to their island of origin that includes both Haiti and Dominican Republic. Speaking in a mixture of French, English and Spanish and Haitian Creole the silhouettes talk back and forth about an environment of equality and collaboration rather than one of friction. On another wall Borlette (Lottery) combines the sculptural inner tubes made of rice paper beaded to resemble Voodou flags, signature elements respectively of García and Charlier's individual practices.

Selected Solo Exhibitions 

 1994: History of a Long Conversation, Galería Art Nouveau, Santo Domingo, Dominican Republic
 1995: Angeles caídos/Fallen Angels, Museo de Arte Moderno, Santo Domingo, Dominican Republic
 1997: Tales of Freedom, Mary Anthony Galleries, New York, NY
 1998: Objects of War/Tales of Freedom, Leonora Vega Gallery, New York, NY
 1998: Cuentos de Salvación, Galería Ultimo Arte, Santo Domingo, Dominican Republic
 2000: Paradise/Paraíso, Havana Biennial, Cuba
 2001: Dios, Patria y Libertad, IV Bienal del Caribe, Santo Domingo, Dominican Republic
 2003: 1 x 1 Individual Projects, Jersey City Museum, Jersey City, NJ
 2006: Paradise: Selected Pieces, Crossroads Gallery, University of Notre Dame, South Bend, IN
 2007: Paradise Redefined, Lehman College Art Gallery, Bronx, NY
 2007: Island of Many Gods, Salena Gallery at Long Island University, Brooklyn, NY
 2008: Morir Soñando, District & Co The Gallery, Santo Domingo, Dominican Republic
 2010: Theories of Freedom, International Visions Gallery, Washington, DC
 2011: Theories of Freedom, Humanities Gallery, Long Island University, Brooklyn, NY
 2012: The Postcard Haiti-Dominican Republic Project Action in collaboration with Borders of Light, Dajabón, Dominican Republic
 2015: Super Trópico/Super Tropics, Lyle O. Reitzel Arte Contemporáneo, Santo Domingo, Dominican Republic
 2015: In Transit/Liquid Highway, Miller Theatre and the Miriam and Ira D. Wallach Art Gallery, Columbia University, New York, NY
 2015: Las Aguas Libres/Waters of Freedom, Gallery of the College of Staten Island, Staten Island, NY
 2016: Cathedral/Catedral, Theories of Freedom, Context New York Art Fair, New York, NY
 2017: In My Floating World, Museum of Latin American Art-Long Beach, Los Angeles Art Show, Los Angeles, CA
 2017: Memories Afloat, Lyle O. Reitzel Contemporary Art Gallery, New York, NY
 2017: It's so Sunny That It's Dark, Clifford Art Gallery, Colgate University, Hamilton, NY
 2018: Fuegos artificiales y otras historias/Fireworks and Other Stories, Lyle O. Reitzel Arte Contemporáneo, Santo Domingo, Dominican Republic
 2019: Stories of Wonder: From This Side of the Atlantic, Praxis Gallery, New York, NY
 2020: The Corona Altar/Day of the Dead, Green-Wood Historical Cemetery, Brooklyn, NY
 2021: Stories of Wonder: When the Sea is My Land, Praxis Gallery, New York, NY
 2022: Collective Portraits: The Map in My Skin, IBIS Contemporary Art Gallery, New Orleans, LA

Selected Duo Exhibitions 

 2016: Unpacking Hispaniola: Scherezade García and Firelei Báez, Taller Puertorriqueño, Philadelphia, PA
 2017: Home is Gold, Taller Boricua Gallery, Julia de Burgos Cultural Center, New York, NY
 2019: Visual Memory: Home + Place, iliana emilia García + Scherezade García, Art Museum of the Americas, Washington, DC
 2022: Memory Keepers/Albaceas de la Memoria, Art Gallery, William Paterson University, Wayne, NJ

Selected Group Exhibitions 

 1991: Impact of Two Worlds, Creative Arts Workshop, New Haven, CT
 1994: Un pie aquí y otro allá, Galería Roberto Ossaye, Santo Domingo, Dominican Republic
 1996: Manifesto, Mary Anthony Gallery, New York, NY
 1997: The New American Art Show, Tweed Gallery at City Hall, New York
 1998: Sound Fates, Leonora Vega Gallery, New York
 2000: The S-Files, El Museo del Barrio, New York
 2000: Poetry and Politics of Art Books, Yale University, New Haven, CT
 2002: Arte Actual, Gallería Carmen Rita Perez, Casa de Campo, La Romana, Dominican Republic
 2003: The Caribbean Abroad: Contemporary Artists and Latino Migration, The Newark Museum, Newark, NJ
 2004: Sin título, Trienal Poligráfica de San Juan, San Juan, Puerto Rico
2004: The Black Atlantic, Haus der Kulture der Welt, Berlin, Germany
 2005: Emerge 6: On Location, Aljira Art Center for Contemporary Art, Newark, NJ
 2007: Away, femmes, diaspora, créativité et dialogue interculturel, UNESCO, Paris, France
2008: Laberynth, Exit Art, New York, NY
2009: Bienal de Arte Interactivo, Museo de Mérida, Mérida, Mexico
2011: Etnia Fair, Espacio Latinoamericano, Brussels, Belgium
2011: On Paper, Abro Gallery, Miami, FL
2011: About Change in Latin America and the Caribbean, The World Bank, Washington, DC
2012: Battlefield from the series Fallen Angels/Angeles caídos, Art in Embassies Program, US Department of State, US Embassy, Montevideo, Uruguay
 2012: El Panal/The Hive, Trienal Poli/Gráfica de San Juan, Casa de Contrafuertes, San Juan, Puerto Rico
2012: Here & There: Dominican York Proyecto GRÁFICA, Barnard College, New York, NY
2013: Our America: The Latino Presence in American Art, Smithsonian American Art Museum, Washington, DC (and national tour)
2014: BRIC Biennial: Volume I, Brooklyn, NY
2014: If You Build It/Sugar Hill. No Longer Empty, New York, NY.
2016: Echos Imprevus/Turning Tide. Memorial ACTe Museum, Basse Terre, Guadaloupe
2016: Rise, Walsh Gallery, Seton Hall University, South Orange, NJ
2016: Latin American Biennial, Longwood Art Gallery at Hostos Community College, Bronx, NY
 2017: The Border Pavilion, Inaugural Autonomous Biennial, Venice, Italy
2017: Relational Undercurrents: Contemporary Art of the Caribbean Archipelago, Museum of Latin American Art, Long Beach, CA (and national tour)
 2017: How to Read El Pato Pascual: Disney's Latin America and Latin America's Disney, MAK Center for Art and Architecture at the Schindler House, Los Angeles, CA
 2018: WATER: Trespassing Liquid Highways, Gallery 102, Corcoran School of the Arts and Design, George Washington University, Washington, DC
2018: Between Two Seas: LA International, Arena 1 Gallery, Santa Monica, CA
 2018: Bordering the Imaginary: Art from the Dominican Republic, Haiti, and Their Diasporas, BRIC, Brooklyn, NY
 2018: Queenie: Selected Artworks by Female Artists from El Museo del Barrio, Hunter College East Harlem Gallery, New York, NY
 2019: The Kingdom of This World Reimagined, Little Haiti Cultural Center, Miami, FL (and national tour)
 2019: Harlem Postcards Spring 2019, The Studio Museum in Harlem, New York, NY
2019: Dimensión Móvil, Centro León, Santiago, Dominican Republic
2021: Trayectos, Centro Cultural de España, Santo Domingo, Dominican Republic
2021: !Printing the Revolution! The Rise and Impact of Chicano Graphics, 1965 to now. Smithsonian American Art Museum, Washington, DC + Traveling Tour
2021: The Kingdom of This World Reimagined, Pensacola Museum of Art, Pensacola, FL + Traveling Tour
2021: Vida, Muerte, Justicia/Life, Deat, Justice: Latin American and Latinx Art for the 21st Century, Ogden Contemporary Art Center, Ogden, UT
2022: Blue, Casa Ossaye, Santo Domingo, Dominican Republic
2022: All My Ancestors: The Spiritual in Afro-LatinX Art, Brandywine Workshop + Archives, Philadelphia, PA
2022: Caribbean Dimensions, Katzen Arts Center, American University Museum, Washington, DC
2022: Mujeres al lente, Museo de Arte Moderno, Santo Domingo, Dominican Republic
2022: Whisper: Poetics of Feminity, Rogaland Kunstneter, Stavanger, Norway
2022: Juan Francisco Elso: Por América, El Museo del Barrio, New York, New York
2022: Floral Fantastic: Eco Critical Contemporary Botanical Art, Apex Gallery, New York, NY

References

Further reading 

 Dardashti, Abigail Lapin. "El Dorado: The Neobaroque in Dominican American Art." Diálogo, Vol. 20, No. 1 (spring 2017): 73–87.
Dardashti, Abigail Lapin. "Tracing the Ocean: Transnational Movement in Scherezade García's Murals, 1997-2018." In Scherezade García: From This Side of the Atlantic, edited by Olga U. Herrera. Washington, DC: Art Museum of the Americas, 2020, pp. 25–31.
 Dardashti, Abigail Lapin, et al. Bordering the Imaginary: Art from the Dominican Republic, Haiti, and Their Diasporas. Exh. cat. Brooklyn, NY: BRIC, 2018.
 Flores, Tatiana and Michelle A. Stephens. Relational Undercurrents: Contemporary Art of the Caribbean Archipelago. Exh. cat. Long Beach, CA: Museum of Latin American Art, 2017.
Fuentes, Elvis. "Solo Show: Scherezade García." Art Nexus, No. 64 (April–June 2007).
Herrera, Olga U. "A Bridge Between Beauty and Tragedy: An Interview with Scherezade García." In Scherezade García: From This Side of the Atlantic, edited by Olga U. Herrera. Washington, DC: Art Museum of the Americas, 2020, pp. 32–36.
Herrera, Olga U. ed. Scherezade García: From This Side of the Atlantic. Washington, DC: Art Museum of the Americas, 2020.
 Kartofel, Graciela and Jan Estep. "A Title?" In Disorienting Signs. Exh. cat.  New York: Leonora Vega Gallery, 1999.
Lerner, Jesse and Rubén Ortiz-Torres.  How to Read El Pato Pascual: Disney's Latin America and Latin America's Disney. Exh. cat. Los Angeles: Black Dog Publishing, 2018.
Maroja, Camila. "Meandering Pathways: Tropical Barroquism in the Work of Scherezade García." In Scherezade García: From This Side of the Atlantic, edited by Olga U. Herrera. Washington, DC: Art Museum of the Americas, 2020, pp. 16–24.
Paulino, Edward and Scherezade García. "Bearing Witness to Genocide: The 1937 Haitian Massacre and Border of Lights." Afro-Hispanic Review, Vol. 32, No. 2 (Fall 2013): 111–118.
Ramos, E. Carmen. Our America: The Latino Presence in American Art. Exh. cat. Washington DC: Smithsonian American Art Museum, 2013, pp. 170–173.
Reinoza, Tatiana. "The Island Within the Island: Remapping Dominican York," Archives of American Art Journal 57, no. 2 (Fall 2018): 4-27.
Sullivan, Edward J. "From Here to Eternity and Other Recent Works by Scherezade Garcia." In Paraíso. Exh. cat. Havana Biennial, Casa de la Cultura Galería Carmelo González, November 2000.

External links 
 Official website
 Smithsonian American Art Museum
 Archives of American Art, Smithsonian Institution
Scherezade Garcia: In Transit/Liquid Highway
Scherezade Garcia-Vasquez, University of Texas at Austin, Department of Art and Art History

1966 births
Living people
20th-century Dominican Republic painters
Dominican Republic expatriates in the United States
20th-century Dominican Republic artists
21st-century Dominican Republic artists
People from Santo Domingo
Dominican Republic women painters
Dominican Republic printmakers
21st-century painters
20th-century printmakers
21st-century printmakers
Women printmakers
20th-century women artists
21st-century women artists
Parsons School of Design alumni
City College of New York alumni
Parsons School of Design faculty
American artists